Brachyopa silviae is a European species of hoverflies.

Distribution
Germany.

References

Diptera of Europe
Eristalinae
Insects described in 2004